Cristiano Leone is an Italian philologist, known for his roles as curator, artistic director and playwright. Currently he teaches at Sciences Po in Paris and the Università Bocconi in Milan.

He has published landmark medievalist works on the fables of Petrus Alphonsi, providing an original genealogy and historical context of these texts. His new translation and informative introduction on Petrus Alphonsi's Disciplina clericalis substantially contributed to understanding Exempla literature in Latin and vernacular.

He was responsible for the cultural programming and for communication at the French Academy in Rome from 2016 to 2019. For this institution, he organised numerous public meetings, curated and coordinated exhibitions with French, Italian and international leading artists.

Since 2019 he runs his own production company, Cristiano Leone Productions. His curatorial approach seeks to connect and encourage the dialogue between contemporary creation, and historical and artistic heritage.

Currently, he holds the position of Artistic and Linguistic Director of the Château de Villers-Cotterêts, the future Cité internationale de la langue française.

Research and Teaching 
Cristiano Leone holds a European PhD in Romance Philology (University of Siena), and an Executive Master of Management (Solvay Brussels School of Economics and Management).

He published in 2010 the first commented edition in Italian of the Disciplina clericalis by Petrus Alphonsi. For the Accademia Nazionale dei Lincei, he edited and published for the first time the Alphunsus de Arabicis eventibus

He has taught courses in Linguistics and Philology at the University of Namur, in Humanities and History at Sciences Po in Paris, and in Cultural Programming at the LUISS Business School of Rome. Currently, he is in charge of seminars on Artistic Direction and Performance Art at Sciences Po Paris and lectures on Performing Arts Management at the Bocconi University, as part of the Master in Art Management and Administration

He was in charge of 'Training and Education' at Paris-Sorbonne University from 2014 to 2016, where he coordinated the innovation projects anticipating the unification of the Parisian universities.

Artistic direction 
From 2016 to 2019, Cristiano Leone was in charge of the cultural programming and communication at the Académie de France in Rome – Villa Medici, under Muriel Mayette-Holtz's direction. For this institution, he curated six seasons of the Thursday at the Villa, weekly appointments with masters of contemporary creation. International personalities were invited to interact with the Romans, which contributed to opening the institution to the public. He also coordinated several exhibitions and curated "Ileana Florescu – Les Chambres du Jardin". In 2016 he took over the artistic direction of the contemporary music festival Villa Aperta. On this occasion, he promoted collaborations between visual artists and musicians, notably inviting the Nobel Prize for Literature Gao Xingjian

For the National Roman Museum and its concession holder Electa, he conceived in 2018 the festival Ō Music, Dance and Art at the Baths of Diocletian. The first edition brought together more than 40 international artists, including Anna Calvi, Seth Troxler, Francesco Tristano, Francis Kurkdjian, and Omar Souleyman.

The festival's second edition in 2019 was re-baptised Ō Tempo di, design, dance, music, theater, cinema and photography at the National Roman Museum. This edition, more extensive, also occupied the Palazzo Altemps and staged among other things a tribute to Fellini by violinist Yury Revich, Pierre Yovanovitch, and the danseur étoile Benjamin Pech.

Since 2019, he runs his own production company: Cristiano Leone Productions.
In 2020 he produced and directed the first chapter of a series called RADIX, a short film promoted by the Cultural Office of the Spanish Embassy in Rome, with the collaboration of the Cervantes Institute in Rome and the Spanish Academy. RADIX invited the Spanish choreographer Iván Pérez, director of the Dance Theatre Heidelberg DTH since 2018, to interact through the medium of dance with the words of the philosopher Seneca in the setting of the Tempietto del Bramante, reviving the shared cultural roots of Italy and Spain.

RADIX 2 premiered on September 2021 on Rai Cultura. It pays homage to two anti-fascists intellectuals: Rafael Alberti and his wife Maria Teresa León. They opposed the Francoist regime and embarked on a 37-year exile. From 1963 Rome became their new homeland for over a decade. The protagonists of RADIX 2, the Basque choreographer and dancer Iratxe Ansa and the Italian dancer Igor Bacovich, read some excerpts from the two writers and dance throughout the external spaces of the Baths of Caracalla. They also evoke the edict by which the Roman emperor granted universal citizenship to all inhabitants of the empire. RADIX 2 is dedicated to all who live a form of exile for having chosen to defend their ideals.

In July 2022, Cristiano Leone acted as playwright and curator of the experimental exhibition Animal Lexicon by the multimedia artist Yuval Avital. This exhibition, created as part of the 2022 Bestiary of the Earth project for the Reggio Parma Festival, in collaboration with Parma’s Teatro Due, blends visual and performance art with theater.

European engagement 
He co-authored an open letter to Angela Merkel, François Hollande and Matteo Renzi on the importance of cultural and youth policies to rebuild a European identity, alongside Wim Wenders, Felipe González, and other intellectuals. The tribune was published in Libération, Die Welt and La Repubblica.

During the debate on the topic "Europe, Security and Reforms", he spoke at the Italian Chamber of Deputies on 27 September 2017.

For the Institute for International Political Studies (ISPI) he wrote an open call to create a large-scale Italian festival aimed to promote the dialogue between contemporary creation and historical heritage.

Theatre and television 
Cristiano Leone is the author of the program "Il giorno della Libertà" for the Italian national channel Rai 3, broadcast on the occasion of the 30th anniversary of the Fall of the Berlin Wall.

He made his debut as a playwright in 2019, during the 55th season of the National Institute of Ancient Drama (INDA) at the Greek Theatre of Syracuse. He presented an adapted version of the classical Greek tragedy The Trojan Women by Euripides, in the acclaimed production directed by Muriel Mayette-Holtz and a set designed by Stefano Boeri.

In 2020, he was the dramaturge and director for the "Processo a Maria-Antonietta" in the Ō Tempo di festival.

Publications 
Art Catalogs

– Curatorship
 L’Académie de France à Rome – Villa Médicis. Roma : Electa. 2018. 132 p. 
 Ileana Florescu Le stanze del giardino / Les chambres du jardin. Roma : Electa. 2018. 48 p. 
 Villa Médicis L'Académie de France à Rome raccontée aux plus jeunes / raccontata ai più giovani, Giulia D’Anna Lupo, Chiara Mezzalama, édité par Cristiano Leone. Roma : Electa. 2018. 80 p. 
– Editorial direction
 Romamor, Anne & Patrick Poirier. Verona : Mondadori Electa. 2019. 93 p.
 Le violon d’Ingres, Verona: Mondadori Electa. 2018. 182 p. 
 Take me (I’m yours). Rome: Accademia di Francia a Roma-Villa Medici. 2018
 Katarina Grosse & Tatiana Trouvé, Le numerose irregolarità. Rome: Electa, 2018 
 Elizabeth Peyton & Camille Claudel, Eternelle idole. Rome: Electa. 2017. 96 p. 
 Swimming is saving . Rome: Electa. 2017 
 Yoko Ono & Claire Tabouret, One day I broke a mirror. Rome: Electa. 2017 
 Messaggera, Annette Messager. Rome : Electa. 2017 

Books
 Disciplina clericalis. Roma : Salerno Editrice, collection "Testi e documenti di letteratura e di lingua n˚ 31". 2010. 187 p. 
 Alphunsus de Arabicis eventibus. Studio ed edizione critica, Roma : Accademia Nazionale de Lincei, collection "Classe di Scienze Morali, Storiche e Filologiche – Memorie serie IX – vol. XXVIII – fasc. 2". 2012 

Articles (selection)
 "Gli epitaffi della ‘Disciplina clericalis’ e della tomba di Giratto: iscrizioni funerarie tra Oriente e Occidente", in Studi mediolatini e volgari, LV. 2009. pp. 97–107. 
 "La réception occidentale du Mukhtar al-hikam à travers ses traductions", in Corpus, Genres, Théories et Méthodes: construction d’une base de données, edited by M.-C. Bornes-Varol and M.- S. Ortola. Nancy: Presses Universitaires. 2010. pp. 81–100. 
 "Une relecture occidentale de la didactique orientale: de la ‘Disciplina clericalis’ et ses traductions-réécritures", in Didaktisches Erzählen. Formen literarischer Belehrung in Orient und Okzident, edited by R. Günthart e R. Forster. Frankfurt a. M.: Lang. 2010. pp. 227–41. 
 "De la Disciplina clericalis à l’Alphunsus de Arabicis eventibus: vers une redéfinition des protagonistes", in Formes dialoguées dans la littérature exemplaire du Moyen Âge, directed by M.-A. Polo de Beaulieu, J. Berlioz, P. Collomb. Paris: Champion. 2012. pp. 359–75. 
 "La performance è solo live? Qualche considerazione inattuale sul rapporto tra arti performative e strumenti audiovisivi", in Riaprire il sipario, ed. Antonio Capitano. Roma : Albeggi Edizioni. 2021. pp. 141–150.

References 

Artistic directors
Romance philologists
Italian curators
Year of birth missing (living people)
Living people